The Nordenskiöld Base is a name used for the facilities shared by the Antarctic stations Wasa (Sweden) and Aboa (Finland). The name is in honor of Otto Nordenskjöld, a Finnish-Swedish polar explorer who was the leader of the first Swedish Antarctic Expedition

References

Outposts of Queen Maud Land
Princess Astrid Coast